Jeffrey Aloysius Van Note (born February 7, 1946) is a former American football center who played for the Atlanta Falcons of the National Football League (NFL) during the 1960s, 1970s and 1980s.  He played college football for the University of Kentucky.  The Atlanta Falcons picked him in the eleventh round of the 1969 NFL Draft.

College career
Van Note played at the University of Kentucky, where he was a running back and defensive end for the Kentucky Wildcats football team from 1966 to 1968.

Professional career
Van Note was drafted as a linebacker by the Atlanta Falcons in the 11th round—the 269th overall pick of the 1969 NFL Draft. During the 1969 season, he played minor league football with the Alabama (Huntsville) Hawks of the Continental Football League.

Van Note soon moved to center by Falcons head coach Norm Van Brocklin.  Despite his modest draft status and lack of experience in the position, Van Note established himself as one of the finest centers in the NFL, making six Pro Bowls and helping the young Atlanta franchise to some of the greatest seasons in team history.  His 18-year tenure with the Falcons is one of the 25 longest in NFL history and is the second longest while staying with the same team.  He played in 246 games over this stretch, and his 225 games started as a Falcon is second in team history to Mike Kenn.  Van Note missed a mere four games in his entire NFL career.

The Falcons retired Van Note's jersey number 57 on December 15, 1986, at halftime of his final home game at Atlanta–Fulton County Stadium, and presented him a 57 Chevy prior to the game.  He would also be voted by fans as the franchise's favorite player during the Falcons' 25th Anniversary season in 1991.  Van Note would be inducted into the Georgia Sports Hall of Fame in 1999.

Broadcasting career
After retiring from professional football, Van Note served as color commentator on the Atlanta Falcons and Kentucky Wildcats football broadcasts throughout the 1990s.  Throughout this period, he would also frequently be heard on Atlanta airwaves as a sports-talk radio host.

Van Note also spent time alongside Joe McConnell as the color commentator for the Tennessee Oilers in 1997.

Van Note gave up his commentator positions with both teams following the 2003 season, but was called back into regular duty when Georgia Tech football analyst Kim King was unable to call games and later died in the fall of 2004.

Though no longer occupying the Falcons' play-by-play booth, he has continued to appear weekly on the Falcons' radio broadcasts, hosting a studio pre-game show and taking calls following the game.

Van Note called the University of Kentucky/Middle Tennessee State game with Tom Leach on UK radio in September 2008, filling in for regular commentator Jeff Piecoro.

Honors
 4 time All-NFC (UPI) - 1975, 1980–1982
 6 time Pro-Bowler - 1974–1975, 1979–1982
 2 time 2nd Team All-Pro (AP) - 1979, 1982
 Induction into the American Football Association's Semi Pro Football Hall of Fame - 1984
 Participant in the collegiate Blue-Gray All-Star game
 Falcons Ring of Honor - 2006
 Harris Poll Voter - 2011

References

External links
Georgia Sports Hall of Fame
American Football Association

1946 births
Living people
American football centers
Atlanta Falcons announcers
Atlanta Falcons players
Continental Football League players
Georgia Tech Yellow Jackets football announcers
Kentucky Wildcats football announcers
Kentucky Wildcats football players
National Conference Pro Bowl players
National Football League announcers
People from South Orange, New Jersey
Players of American football from New Jersey
Tennessee Titans announcers
Presidents of the National Football League Players Association
Trade unionists from Kentucky
Ed Block Courage Award recipients